Talgat Kadyrovich Nigmatulin (5 March 1949, in Kyzyl-Kiya – 11 February 1985, in Vilnius) was a famous Soviet actor and martial artist. Nigmatullin was born on October 5, 1949 in a Tatar-Uzbek family in Kirgizia. He took part in many action movies. Perhaps his most famous movie was Pirates of the 20th Century. He also appeared in other films as shown below.

Selected filmography
 1969 — Her Name is Spring (Её имя — Весна) as Pulat Sadykov
 1971 — The Night At the 14th Parallel as Sitong
 1972 — The Seventh Bullet (Седьмая пуля) as Ismail
 1977 — Armed and Dangerous (Вооружен и очень опасен) as Joyce
 1979 — Pirates of the 20th Century (Пираты 20-ого века) as Salikh
 1981 — The Right to Shoot as captain of the schooner «Kiyoshi»
 1981 — The Adventures of Tom Sawyer and Huckleberry Finn (Приключения Тома Сойера и Гекльберри Финна) as Injun Joe
 1983 — The Wolf Pit (Волчья яма) as Samat Kasimov
 1984 — Lonely and Unarmed (Один и без оружия) as Khan
 1985 — Confrontation (Противостояние) as Urazbaev, a police captain in Kokand

Death
Nigmatulin became a follower of Abai Borubayev, a teacher from Central Asia who had found favour with Moscow art circles, and was murdered in 1985 by other followers of Borubayev, in the latter's presence.

References

External links

1949 births
1985 deaths
Gerasimov Institute of Cinematography alumni
Uzbeks
Tatar people
Soviet male film actors
Kazakhstani male actors
20th-century Kazakhstani male actors
21st-century Kazakhstani male actors